Bhuvneshwar Kumar Singh (born 5 February 1990) is an Indian international cricketer who is playing for the Indian cricket team. He currently plays for Sunrisers Hyderabad in the Indian Premier League and Uttar Pradesh in domestic cricket. He is considered to be one of the best and most consistent swing bowlers in the world. Kumar swings the ball both ways efficiently, with his inswingers more effective than outswing. Initially starting his career as an opening swing bowler, Bhuvneshwar kumar upgraded his bowling armoury with reverse swing, slower bowls and Yorkers to become a death over specialist too.

He made his international debut in December 2012 against Pakistan in December 2012, taking three wickets in an Twenty20 International.He is only bowler to take wickets  wicket on his first ball i n T20I & ODI Debut match. He went on to make his One Day International (ODI) debut in the series which followed. He is the first Indian bowler to take a five-wicket haul in Test cricket, ODIs and T20Is.

Early life
Bhuvneshwar Kumar was born into a Gurjar family in Meerut on 5 February 1990.

His sister encouraged him to play cricket and took him to his first coaching centre when he was 13.

Domestic career
Kumar plays for Uttar Pradesh in domestic cricket; he has also played for Central Zone in the Duleep Trophy and made his first-class debut at the age of 17 against Bengal. In the 2008/09 Ranji Trophy final, he became the first bowler to dismiss Sachin Tendulkar for a duck in first-class cricket.

Indian Premier League
Following his performances in the 2008/09 Ranji season, he was given an Indian Premier League (IPL) contract by Royal Challengers Bangalore. In 2011, he was signed by Pune Warriors India, but after the team was dissolved in 2013, he was bought by Sunrisers Hyderabad for ₹4.25 crores during the 2014 IPL Auction.

In 2016, he played in Sunrisers' team which won the 2016 Indian Premier League, taking 23 wickets and winning the Purple Cap as the bowler who took most wickets during the season. In 2018, he was named the team's vice-captain.

In the 2022 Indian Premier League mega-auction Bhuvi was bought by the Sunrisers Hyderabad for ₹4.20 crores. In IPL 2022's last league game (SRH v PBKS), he was selected as the captain of SRH as their permanent captain for that session (Kane Williamson) was rested.

International career

Kumar made his international debut at the end of 2012, playing in T20I and ODI matches against Pakistan. He made his Test debut in 2013 and was part of the Indian team which won the 2013 Champions Trophy. He was named in the Team of the Tournament by the International Cricket Council (ICC).

In July 2013, he posted career-best figures of four wickets for eight runs (4/8) against Sri Lanka in the Tri-Nation tournament. He was the leading wicket taker in the tournament and awarded the Player of the Series.

During the 2014 tour of England, Kumar took new career-best Test match bowling figures of 6/82 at Lord's; he was named the Indian Player of the Series.

In February 2018, he took a five-wicket haul in a T20I against South Africa. He became the second Indian bowler to take 5 wickets in T20Is. In January 2019, in the first ODI against Australia, Kumar took his 100th wicket in ODIs. In April 2019, he was named in India's squad for the 2019 Cricket World Cup but was later ruled out of a number of matches due to a leg injury. In June 2021, he was named India's vice-captain for their ODI and T20I matches against Sri Lanka and in September 2021, Kumar was named in India's squad for the 2021 ICC Men's T20 World Cup.

In June 2022, Kumar was named India's vice-captain for their T20I matches against Ireland.

Personal life 
On 23 November 2017, Kumar married Nupur Nagar in Meerut, Uttar Pradesh. They became parents to a baby girl named Acsah on 24 November 2021.

References

External links 
 
 Bhuvneshwar Kumar's profile page on Wisden
 Bhuvneshwar Kumar – CricBuzz
 

1990 births
Living people
Indian cricketers
Sunrisers Hyderabad cricketers
Pune Warriors India cricketers
Uttar Pradesh cricketers
Central Zone cricketers
India One Day International cricketers
India Test cricketers
India Twenty20 International cricketers
India Blue cricketers
Sportspeople from Meerut
Cricketers at the 2015 Cricket World Cup
Cricketers at the 2019 Cricket World Cup
Royal Challengers Bangalore cricketers